Ridgehaven is a suburb of Adelaide, South Australia in the City of Tea Tree Gully.

Geography
Ridgehaven is located in the North Eastern suburbs and is approximately 15 km from the Adelaide CBD. The largely residential suburb is bordered by North East Road to the south, Golden Grove Road to the west, Hancock Road to the east, and Milne Road to the north.

History

Development of Ridgehaven dates from the 1950s. Most housing in the suburb was constructed during the 1960s. Today Ridgehaven is a well established, largely residential suburb, with a stable population. Relatively low numbers of new dwellings have been constructed between 1996 and 2001.

Schools
Ridgehaven contains one school, Ridgehaven Primary School, on Milne Road.

References

Suburbs of Adelaide